Krajna Landscape Park (Krajeński Park Krajobrazowy) is a protected area (Landscape Park) in the Krajna region of north-central Poland.

The Park lies within Kuyavian-Pomeranian Voivodeship: in Nakło County (Gmina Mrocza) and Sępólno County (Gmina Sępólno Krajeńskie, Gmina Kamień Krajeński, Gmina Sośno, Gmina Więcbork).

Within the Landscape Park are five nature reserves.

References 

Krajna
Parks in Kuyavian-Pomeranian Voivodeship
Nakło County
Sępólno County